The Utah Department of Health is the Government of Utah's body responsible for public health.

It is headquartered in the Cannon Health Building in Salt Lake City.

Services
In July 2014 the Utah Department of Health issued its first permits for hash oil.

In 2012 a major data breach allowed hackers to access the health data of 700,000 people in the Department of Health records.

Utah Department of Health enables consumer access to personal and family immunization records on-file with Utah State Immunization Information System (USIIS) through the Docket app.

References

External links

State departments of health of the United States
Medical and health organizations based in Utah